Charles Joseph Prestia (September 3, 1909 – January 3, 1953) was an American politician and businessman who served one term as Secretary of the State of Connecticut from 1945 to 1947. A Democrat from New Britain, Connecticut, he served as a New Britain city councilor and alderman from 1935 to 1946 and as a Connecticut State Representative in 1935. Prestia also served on the Democratic state central committee and New Britain's Democratic town committee for "a number of years." 

Born in New Britain to Italian-American parents Joseph and Lucia Prestia, Prestia graduated from New Britain High School and became vice president of sales at Spring Beverage Works, a local soft drinks company owned by his father. He died after a long illness at New Britain General Hospital at the age of 43. He had chaired the state police board from 1950 until his death.

References 

1909 births
1953 deaths
People from New Britain, Connecticut
Secretaries of the State of Connecticut
Connecticut Democrats
20th-century American politicians
American people of Italian descent